David Howland (born 17 September 1986) is a Northern Irish former professional footballer who played as a midfielder. He scored 17 goals in 171 league a cup appearances in an eleven-year career in professional and semi-professional football in England and Northern Ireland.

A Northern Ireland under-21 international, he started his career at Birmingham City. In January 2008, he was loaned out to Port Vale, and joined the club on a permanent basis at the end of the season. He was released by Port Vale in the summer of 2010, at which point he signed with Glentoran. He helped the club to win the Irish Cup in 2013, before he retired due to injury in August 2016.

Club career

Birmingham City
Howland was born in Ballynahinch, County Down, and joined Birmingham City's Academy in 2002. He signed his first one-year professional contract in 2005, which was renewed for a further year. He was allocated a first-team squad number for the first time during the 2006–07 season, and signed a further year's contract before the 2007–08 season. A central midfielder, he played regularly for Birmingham's reserve team but did not make an appearance for the first team.

He was an unused substitute in the League Cup fourth round tie against Blackburn Rovers in September 2007 in unusual circumstances. Birmingham had selected the 15-year-old Jordon Mutch, having obtained confirmation from the Premier League that it was within the rules for a boy of that age to play, but were informed less than two hours before kick-off that due to the Football Association's child protection rules Mutch would not be eligible. Special dispensation was granted for Howland, who had not been assigned a squad number for the 2007–08 season, to take his place on the bench wearing a numberless shirt.

Port Vale
In January 2008 he joined Port Vale of League One on loan for the remainder of the season, and made his debut in the Football League on 26 January 2008 against AFC Bournemouth.
At the end of the season he was released by Birmingham, but his performance while on loan at Port Vale was sufficient to earn him a two-year permanent deal.

He was one of few Vale players to hit 40 games in the 2008–09 season. He enjoyed his time under Dean Glover, especially in games with Glover's five-man midfield tactic. However, he was transfer listed by new manager Micky Adams in August 2009, along with five others, having failed to impress in the pre-season. After a month on the transfer list, he was the only one of the six to have received no inquiries from any clubs, which came as a surprise to many Vale fans. He returned to the Vale first team in mid-September, after impressing in training, though he remained transfer listed. In April 2010 he learned that he would not be offered a new contract by manager Micky Adams.

Glentoran
In September 2010, Howland left England for Belfast, signing a season long contract with IFA Premiership club Glentoran. He made his debut in the televised Sky Sports match at home to Linfield. He was utilised in the playmaker role in the heart of the midfield. The "Glens" finished in third place in 2010–11, qualifying for the UEFA Europa League. In January 2011, he signed a contract to keep him at the club until 2014. Glentoran then finished sixth in 2011–12. They finished fourth in 2012–13, and qualified for the Europa League. Glentoran also won the Irish Cup, and Howland played in the 3–1 final victory over Cliftonville. Howland also featured in the club's Europa League qualification defeat to Icelandic club KR. The "Glens" finished the 2013–14 season in fifth place, though Howland missed much of the campaign after injuring cartilage in his knee. He featured ten times in the 2014–15 campaign, and just once in the 2015–16 season, before he announced his retirement in August 2016, owing to a long-standing injury.

International career
Howland represented Northern Ireland at junior levels and was first selected for the under-21 squad in February 2006. He won four caps at under-21 level.

Physiotherapy career
Howland graduated as a physiotherapist, and secured a job at the Crewe Alexandra Academy in 2016.

Career statistics

Honours
Glentoran
Irish Cup: 2012–13

References

External links

People from Ballynahinch, County Down
Association footballers from Northern Ireland
Northern Ireland under-21 international footballers
Association football midfielders
Birmingham City F.C. players
Port Vale F.C. players
Glentoran F.C. players
English Football League players
Association football physiotherapists
Crewe Alexandra F.C. non-playing staff
1986 births
Living people